Diocese of Smederevo may refer to:

 Serbian Orthodox Diocese of Smederevo, former diocese (eparchy) of the Serbian Orthodox Church
 Roman Catholic Diocese of Smederevo, former diocese of the Catholic Church in Serbia

See also
Smederevo
Eastern Orthodoxy in Serbia
Catholic Church in Serbia
Archdiocese of Belgrade (disambiguation)